Miller Spur (‘Rid Miller’ \'rid 'mi-ler\ is the narrow rocky ridge of elevation decreasing from 1700 to 900 m, projecting from Detroit Plateau 2.9 km west-northwestwards into upper Cayley Glacier on Danco Coast in Graham Land, Antarctica.

The ridge is named after the German geologist Hubert Miller, researcher at St. Kliment Ohridski base in 2001/02 season, for his support for the Bulgarian Antarctic programme.

Location
British mapping in 1978.

Maps
British Antarctic Territory. Scale 1:200000 topographic map. DOS 610 Series, Sheet W 64 60. Directorate of Overseas Surveys, Tolworth, UK, 1978.
 Antarctic Digital Database (ADD). Scale 1:250000 topographic map of Antarctica. Scientific Committee on Antarctic Research (SCAR). Since 1993, regularly upgraded and updated.

Notes

References
 Bulgarian Antarctic Gazetteer. Antarctic Place-names Commission. (details in Bulgarian, basic data in English)
Miller Spur. SCAR Composite Gazetteer of Antarctica

External links
 Miller Spur. Adjusted Copernix satellite image

Ridges of Graham Land
Bulgaria and the Antarctic
Danco Coast